Stephen Roy Kelly (January 3, 1897 – February 1, 1990) was a Canadian politician. He served in the Legislative Assembly of New Brunswick as member of the New Brunswick Liberal Association from 1948 to 1952.

References

1897 births
1990 deaths
New Brunswick Liberal Association MLAs
Politicians from Saint John, New Brunswick
20th-century Canadian politicians
20th-century Canadian lawyers